Kolkata Knight Riders (KKR) are  a franchise cricket team representing the city of Kolkata in the Indian Premier League. The franchise is owned by Bollywood actor Shah Rukh Khan, actress Juhi Chawla and her spouse Jay Mehta. The Knight Riders play at the Eden Gardens stadium.

The franchise, which has gained immense popularity due to its association with celebrity owners, qualified for the IPL playoffs for the first time in 2011. They became the IPL champions in 2012, by defeating Chennai Super Kings in the final. They repeated the feat in 2014, defeating Kings XI Punjab. The Knight Riders hold the record for the longest winning streak by any Indian team in T20s (14).

The side's all-time leading run-scorer is Gautam Gambhir, while their leading wicket-taker is Sunil Narine. The official theme of the team is Korbo, Lorbo, Jeetbo Re (we will perform, fight, and win!) and the official colours are purple and gold.

Franchise history 

In 2007, the Board of Control for Cricket in India (BCCI) created the cricket tournament Indian Premier League, based on the Twenty20 format of the game. Eight teams participated in the inaugural tournament held in April – June 2008. The teams representing the eight different cities of India were put up on auction in Mumbai on 20 February 2008. The team representing Kolkata was eventually bought by Bollywood superstar Shah Rukh Khan's company Red Chillies Entertainment in partnership with actress Juhi Chawla and her husband Jay Mehta for a price of $75.09 million, equal to approximately ₹2.98 billion at that time. Sourav Ganguly, former captain of the Indian national team, a native of West Bengal and the current President of BCCI, was named the Icon player for the team. The name of the team is a reference to the popular 1980s American television series Knight Rider.

In June 2015, the team's ownership group bought a stake in the Caribbean Premier League's Trinidad and Tobago Red Steel, and renamed it the Trinbago Knight Riders in 2016. In December 2020, the team also made an investment in the upcoming American T20 league Major League Cricket.

In 2021, the Knight Riders Group CEO, Venky Mysore, announced their entry into the South African T20 league with Cape Town Knight Riders and signalled intentions to invest in ECB's new competition format, The Hundred.

Valuation 
According to Forbes in 2022, the valuation of Kolkata Knight Riders stand at $1.1 billion.

Livery 
Initially, when the Kolkata Knight Riders were first introduced in 2008, the logo of the team consisted of a blazing golden Viking helmet against a black background with the name of the team written in gold next to it. However, the black background was changed to purple in the third season. It was in 2012 that the current logo, which has a blazing purple Corinthian helmet trimmed with gold, with Kolkata Knight Riders written within a shield was introduced.

The tagline of the team was "All the King's Men" during the first four seasons. However, in the fifth it was replaced by "New Dawn, New Knights". The team's official colours were black and gold during the first two seasons. At the time, Khan said that "golden symbolizes spirit of life and black presents the Goddess Kali." It was later changed to purple and gold during the third season and was kept so. The jersey was created by Bollywood fashion designer Manish Malhotra.

The main theme of the team Korbo, Lorbo, Jeetbo Re (we will act, fight, and win!) was scored by Vishal–Shekhar duo. A Knight Riders album featuring several singers and music composers including Usha Uthup and Bappi Lahiri was also created.

Rivalries 
The Knight Riders have historically been a successful franchise in the IPL. This success has led to them having many rivalries among other teams.

Mumbai Indians 
Both the teams play in major markets, as the Mumbai Indians play in Mumbai and the Kolkata Knight Riders play in Kolkata. The Mumbai Indians are the most successful IPL franchise with five championships, but until Mumbai's third championship, both the teams were tied with two championships. In the first two seasons of the IPL, Mumbai swept Kolkata in all four games. It was not until the 2010 IPL Season that Kolkata won against Mumbai. Both sides have been captained by Indian cricket legends at one point (Mumbai was captained by Sachin Tendulkar, and Kolkata was captained by Sourav Ganguly). This rivalry has often played out in Mumbai's favour, as they have won 22 games compared to Kolkata's nine wins. Both have played each other twice in the playoffs.

In 2011, both teams played against each other in the Eliminator round, as both franchises made their first playoff appearances. This was the first time that the two teams met in the playoffs. Mumbai won the match by four wickets and advanced to the next round, ultimately losing to the Royal Challengers Bangalore.

In 2012, both the teams were chasing a playoff spot in the tournament. The game started out poorly for KKR as their batting side did not score runs. KKR picked up the pace and ended the innings with 140/7. Mumbai was expected to win at that point and started to attack quickly, and started 60/2 with more than 10 overs left to play. Mumbai quickly collapsed and finished their innings with 108 runs and all out. Sunil Narine was named Man of the Match with 4 wickets, and KKR eliminated MI from the playoffs. KKR won its first championship that season. Knight Riders owner Shah Rukh Khan was handed a 5-year ban at Wankhede Stadium, home of the Mumbai Indians. He was accused of walking on the field post-match and abusing the security guards. In 2015, the ban was lifted.

Mumbai and Kolkata faced off in the opening match of the 2015 season. Mumbai was up to bat in the first innings as they scored 168/3. This charge was led by captain Rohit Sharma with his 98 runs. Kolkata captain, Gautam Gambhir had 57 runs and led his side to victory. Suryakumar Yadav's 46 runs were crucial to KKR's chase.

In 2017, Mumbai earned its 100th T20 win against KKR. Later that season, both sides met in the playoffs in the Qualifier 2 round. KKR had a poor batting performance as they posted 107 runs and all out. Mumbai was able to capitalise and won the match. Mumbai went onto the finals to beat Rising Pune Supergiant to claim their third championship.

From 2015 to 2018, Mumbai Indians held an eight-game winning streak against the Kolkata Knight Riders. That streak was broken on 29 April 2019, as KKR posted a total of 232 runs and won by 34 runs. KKR's Andre Russell scored 80 runs, and MI's Hardik Pandya scored 91 runs. KKR holds the record for highest total for an IPL match played at Eden Gardens. This victory was KKR's 100th T20 win. Mumbai have won all three games between them since then.

In the 2022 season, Kolkata beat Mumbai in all the matches between them.

Royal Challengers Bangalore 

The rivalry between Kolkata Knight Riders and Royal Challengers Bangalore is one of the oldest in the IPL. The inaugural match of IPL was played between both the teams in which KKR won by 140 runs due to a 158* off just 73 balls by Brendon McCullum.

In IPL 2009, both teams faced off against each other again in which RCB won both times. In the second time they faced each other, Ross Taylor scored a blitzkrieg 81* off 33 balls to win it for RCB by six wickets.

In the 2012 edition of IPL, KKR was at the lower half of the IPL table and needed to win the crucial match against RCB. KKR won the toss and chose to bat first. The skipper Gautam Gambhir led from the front with 93 (51). In reply, RCB lost wickets at regular intervals, as only Chris Gayle managed to put up a fight with a score of 86 (58). The next time they met, Gambhir again was the thorn of RCB as he top scored for KKR at a tough pitch, taking KKR to a competitive total of 165. RCB in reply made 129, as Lakshmipathy Balaji ripped through their lineup with a 4/18 in 4 overs.

In the 2015 IPL edition, RCB and KKR took part in a match reduced due to rain. It was reduced to a 10 over match. RCB won the toss and elected to field. For KKR, Andre Russell was the top scorer as he scored 45 off just 17 balls as he took them to a score of 111/4 in just 10 overs. Mitchell Starc took one wicket for 15 runs in 2 overs. In reply, RCB were at 0–48 at 3.4 overs before Brad Hogg got Chris Gayle out. After that, RCB stuttered and started to collapse as they were reduced to 3–81 in 7.2 overs. When Virat Kohli got out to Andre Russell, the match looked to be over for RCB. However, Mandeep Singh scored 45 off just 18 balls hitting 3 sixes and 4 fours.

In the 2017 IPL edition, Kolkata Knight Riders and Royal Challengers Bangalore locked horns with one another again. In the first match between them, RCB got KKR put for a score of 131 after KKR got off to a strong start of 0–48 in 3.3 overs. However, KKR reduced RCB to 49/9 before getting the final wicket, resulting in RCB getting the lowest score in the history of IPL – 49 all out. Nathan Coulter Nile, Colin de Grandhomme and Chris Woakes got three wickets each. In the next time they faced, Sunil Narine scored the fastest fifty of IPL then and the second fastest now (50 off 15 balls). KKR made the highest score made in powerplay in any IPL match, and chased down the target offered by RCB easily.

The 2019 IPL saw Virat Kohli scoring 84 off 49 and AB de Villiers scoring 63 off 32, taking RCB to a total of 205/3. KKR had a strong start scoring 28/0 in 1.3 overs before losing wickets at regular intervals and having their run rate reduced. They were 139/4 in 15.5 overs. Dinesh Karthik and Andre Russell however brought back the chase on control. Karthik got out scoring 19 off 15, leaving KKR at 153/5 in 17 overs. Andre Russell, however, took KKR over the line as he scored 48 off 13, hitting Mohammed Siraj for 23 runs in one over.

In the next match, RCB struck back as Virat Kohli made his 5th IPL century scoring 100 runs in 58 balls only. Moeen Ali scored 66 runs in only 28 balls as RCB scored 213 runs. For KKR, Nitish Rana scored 85 off 46 and Andre Russell scored 65 off 25, taking the game to the wire. However, RCB won the match by 10 runs, with Virat Kohli being Man of the Match.

Home ground 
The home venue of the Knight Riders is Eden Gardens (with the two ends of the crease called the High Court End and the Club House End). Owned by the Cricket Association of Bengal, it was the largest cricket stadium in India and had a seating capacity of over 90,000. In 2011, the stadium was renovated to meet the standards set by the International Cricket Council for the 2011 Cricket World Cup; reducing its capacity to around 68,000. The renovated stadium includes a new clubhouse and players' facilities, upgrading the exterior wall, cladding the existing roof structure with a new metal skin, and general infrastructure improvements. In 2013, two of the team's home matches were hosted by the JSCA International Cricket Stadium in Ranchi.

Kit manufacturers and sponsors
Multinational communications corporation Nokia was the official founding sponsor of the Kolkata Knight Riders and remained their principal sponsor until 2014. In 2015, Chinese mobile phone manufacturer Gionee took over as their principal sponsor and signed a three-year deal worth . In 2018, Nokia returned as the main sponsor of the Knight Riders, signing a two-year deal. Star Plus, Reebok, HDIL, Kit Kat, SB Nation, Doublemint, SAP AG, Asian Paints, Red FM 93.5, The Telegraph, Seiko, U.S. Polo Assn., Uber, Dish TV, Sansui Electric, Ola Cabs, Exide, Ibibo, Sprite, Dream11, Pepsi, Sony Music India, Royal Stag, Greenply, MoneyGram, Fever 104 FM and Pocari Sweat have all formerly been either co-sponsors or partners.

In 2020, MPL became their principal sponsor. As of 2021, they have co-sponsorship deals with Jio, Lux Cozi, Colgate, Pentonic and Unacademy along with others. They also have partnerships with Kotak Mahindra Bank, BKT Tyres, Kingfisher Calendar, Amul Kool and MX Takatak. In 2022, the Esports app, WinZO Sports entered into a long-term partnership as the principal sponsor of the Kolkata Knight Riders.

Players 
Sourav Ganguly, the former captain of the Indian cricket team was the icon player and led the franchise in the 2008 and 2010 seasons. Brendon McCullum led the team in the intervening period. Both the captains were released before the 2011 season. The former team included all-rounders Chris Gayle, David Hussey, Mohammad Hafeez, Laxmi Ratan Shukla, Angelo Mathews, batsman Ricky Ponting, Brad Hodge, Salman Butt and wicket-keeper Wriddhiman Saha. The main bowlers were Umar Gul, Shoaib Akhtar, Ishant Sharma, Ashok Dinda, Ajit Agarkar and Murali Karthik. Australian batsman Brad Hodge and bowlers Ajantha Mendis and Charl Langeveldt were bought outside the IPL auction in late 2008.

At the 2009 auction, the team bought Bangladeshi all-rounder Mashrafe Mortaza for $600,000. Due to the unavailability of Pakistani players starting 2009, KKR had to suspend the contract of Umar Gul, who was a key performer from the 2008 season. On 26 April 2009, KKR administration sent back two of its players Akash Chopra and Sanjay Bangar on the premises of poor performance. Shane Bond was acquired after releasing Ricky Ponting, Morne van Wyk and the Pakistani players Umar Gul, Salman Butt, Mohammad Hafeez and Shoaib Akhtar before the third season. Moises Henriques was traded to Delhi in return for Owais Shah and Manoj Tiwary. Thus, their overseas roster for the 2010 season consisted of Shane Bond, Mashrafe Mortaza, Brendon McCullum, Charl Langeveldt, Ajantha Mendis, Angelo Mathews, Brad Hodge, David Hussey, Owais Shah and Chris Gayle.

2011 heralded the beginning of a new era for KKR. In the 2011 season, KKR drastically revamped their squad. Former captain and icon player Sourav Ganguly was not purchased in the January auction. This led to protest rallies, signature campaigns throughout the country and abroad along with stadium protests by various fan groups, such as 'No Dada No KKR', which received both national and international press attention. The team appointed Gautam Gambhir, who was bought for a record-breaking $2.4 million as skipper. Yusuf Pathan was also picked up for $2.1 million. Other international names who were added include Shakib Al Hasan, Brad Haddin, Jacques Kallis, Brett Lee, Ryan ten Doeschate, Eoin Morgan and James Pattinson. Haddin was replaced by Mark Boucher mid-season due to injury.

In the 2012 auction, KKR bought back their former captain, Brendon McCullum. They also acquired West Indian spinner Sunil Narine and South African fast bowler Marchant de Lange.

The team later added four domestic players to their squad, including Debabrata Das and Iresh Saxena from Bengal, Saurashtra's Chirag Jani and Sanju Samson from Kerala. However, in November 2012, KKR released the latter three from their team along with Jaydev Unadkat, a key performer from the previous seasons. In the 2013 auction, the team acquired only two overseas players, Sachithra Senanayake and Ryan McLaren.

Before the February 2014 auction, the team had only retained their key performers Gautam Gambhir and Sunil Narine. From the auctions that took place, the team brought back Jacques Kallis and Yusuf Pathan with their right-to-match (RTM) card. Also keeping their place in the squad were Ryan ten Doeschate and Shakib Al Hasan. New international players were Morne Morkel, Patrick Cummins and Chris Lynn. Prominent Indian players bought included Robin Uthappa, Umesh Yadav, Manish Pandey, Suryakumar Yadav and Piyush Chawla.

KKR's impressive additions in the 2015 auction were veteran Australian bowler Brad Hogg and wicket-keeper Sheldon Jackson. Before the auction in February 2016, they released Ryan ten Doeschate who was a part of their team for five consecutive seasons along with pace bowler Pat Cummins. The Knight Riders were particularly noted for their change in approach from the previous auctions where they had concentrated on spinners. For the 2016 edition, however, they acquired as many as six pacers in the form of all-rounders John Hastings, Colin Munro, Jason Holder and Rajagopal Sathish as well as bowlers Ankit Rajpoot and Jaydev Unadkat, with the latter being a former player of the squad. They signed one spinner Manan Sharma.

Before the 2017 auctions, they released Morne Morkel, Brad Hogg, Jason Holder, Colin Munro, John Hastings, Jaydev Unadkat, Rajagopal Sathish, Manan Sharma and replacement signing Shaun Tait. From the 2017 Indian Premier League auction, they signed Trent Boult, English all-rounder Chris Woakes, Australian Nathan Coulter-Nile, West Indian Darren Bravo and Jamaican Rovman Powell. The domestic players signed were Rishi Dhawan, Ishank Jaggi, Sayan Ghosh and R Sanjay Yadav. At the time, Andre Russell was banned for one year for doping; he was replaced by Colin de Grandhomme for the season. In January 2018, they only retained West Indian cricketers Sunil Narine and Andre Russell. Their two-time title winning captain Gautam Gambhir was released. At the auction, they retained Robin Uthappa, Piyush Chawla and Kuldeep Yadav using RTM (Right-To-Match) card. KKR also bought back opener Chris Lynn and uncapped Indian batsman Ishank Jaggi. Other uncapped batsmen bought were Nitish Rana, Shubman Gill, Cameron Delport, Rinku Singh and Apoorv Wankhade. They also bought West Indian uncapped all-rounder Javon Searles and uncapped Indian all-rounders Kamlesh Nagarkoti and Shivam Mavi. Other signings were veteran Indian wicket-keeper Dinesh Karthik, Australian pace bowlers Mitchell Starc and Mitchell Johnson and former Knight Riders player Vinay Kumar.

On 4 March 2018, Dinesh Karthik was appointed as the captain of KKR for IPL 2018 and Robin Uthappa was named vice-captain. Mitchell Starc was ruled out before the season due to injury and Tom Curran was announced as his replacement. Ahead of the auction for IPL 2019, eight players were released from the squad including Mitchell Starc and his replacement Tom Curran.

Other players bought were South African pacer Anrich Nortje, English duo Harry Gurney and Joe Denly as well as uncapped Indian players Nikhil Naik, Prithvi Raj Yarra and Shrikant Mundhe for their base prices of  each. Before IPL 2020, KKR released 11 players from their squad and also traded in Siddhesh Lad from Mumbai Indians.

At the 2020 IPL Auction, KKR bought pace bowler Pat Cummins for ₹15.5 crores. This was the biggest buy in the auction. KKR also purchased Eoin Morgan, who just came off as captain of the World Cup winning England squad. He was bought for ₹5.25 crores. On 16 October 2020, Kolkata Knight Riders skipper Dinesh Karthik handed over Kolkata Knight Riders' captaincy to Eoin Morgan.

Since 2022 was a mega auction, Kolkata Knight Riders had to release majority of players including top order batsman Shubman Gill, skipper Eoin Morgan and vice captain Dinesh Karthik. KKR retained 4 players; Andre Russell for 12 crore, Sunil Narine for 6 crore and Varun Chakravarthy and Venkatesh Iyer for 8 crore each. With 48 crore in their purse, KKR bought marquee players Shreyas Iyer for 12.25 crore and re-signed Pat Cummins for 7.25 crore. KKR also bought back Nitish Rana, Sheldon Jackson, Rinku Singh, Shivam Mavi and Tim Southee. Overseas players included English wicket-keeper Sam Billings for 2 crore, English batsman Alex Hales for 1.5 crore, Afghan all-rounder Mohammed Nabi for 1 crore and Sri Lankan all-rounder Chamika Karunaratne for 50 lakh. KKR also signed top order batsman Ajinkya Rahane, Jharkhand left-handed spin all-rounder Anukul Roy and Jammu and Kashmir pacer Rasikh Salam Dar. They also bought back their former player Umesh Yadav for the base price of 2 crores, who last played for them in 2017. Alex Hales didn't turn up for the IPL citing personal reasons and KKR signed Australian skipper Aaron Finch as his replacement. In the middle of tournament, Rasikh suffered injury which ruled him out of IPL tournament. Due to this, KKR signed fast bowler Harshit Rana as the replacement.

Seasons

Indian Premier League

Champions League Twenty20

Current squad 
 Players with international caps are listed in bold.

Administration and support staff

Statistics

Overall results 

Updated as of 15 October 2021

 Abandoned matches are counted as NR (no result)
 Win or loss by super over or boundary count included

Source: ESPNCricinfo

Result summary 
Updated as of 15 October 2021

Legend:

Overall results in Champions League Twenty20

Knight Riders Group
Kolkata Knight Riders is part of the Knight Riders Group (KRG), a global brand in cricket, with franchises in the Caribbean Premier League (Trinbago Knight Riders), the upcoming Major League Cricket (Los Angeles Knight Riders), and in the upcoming International League T20 (Abu Dhabi Knight Riders) of UAE. KRG had also acquired a franchise in Cricket South Africa's T20 Global League, but the league was eventually scrapped and replaced with Mzansi Super League due to the absence of the board to secure a broadcasting deal. Other Indian Premier League Franchises have followed KRG's path and have franchises in T20 Leagues outside India, or have shown interest for the same. In 2022, KRG announced the construction of a 10,000-seater stadium in Los Angeles, in partnership with Major League Cricket, for their franchise (Los Angeles Knight Riders).

In popular culture
A reality show by the name Knights and Angels aired on NDTV Imagine in 2009 to pick six cheerleaders for the Knight Riders for the 2009 edition of the Indian Premier League.

See also 

Trinbago Knight Riders

References

External links 
 
 Kolkata Knight Riders on IPLT20 Website

Indian Premier League teams
Sports clubs in Kolkata
Sports clubs in India
Cricket clubs established in 2008
Cricket in Kolkata
2008 establishments in West Bengal
Red Chillies Entertainment